Chinese Friendship Farms are part of the agricultural cooperation of the People's Republic of China with many African states. Some of the numerous projects started as development aid, other (and later) engagements lost this aspect. 

"China's 'Friendship Farms' in various African countries are formally owned by a Chinese parastatal organisation, but are mostly medium scale, usually below 1000 hectares."
While the intended and more often cited farm sizes are reported in the thousands, actual sizes are much smaller or the engagement never became operational.
In the context of large-scale land acquisitions they are, therefore, among smaller engagements.

Many of the plantations indeed carry the name "Friendship Farm". In projects oriented towards production this implies a "political requests by the host government".
Farmers on both sides consider the activities as a political task as well, where they equate political with building friendships. In the context of Mozambique this means to concentrate on crops that improve local food security.
This, however, does not exclude an economic and profit-maximizing interest. In Mozambique a project initialized as an aid project is now open to invest in cash crops such as soybeans, rapeseed, tobacco for the Chinese market or organic vegetables for the Europe.

Official Chinese government information from 2006 claims that through agricultural cooperation between China and Africa 40 countries could establish "agro technology pilot or demonstration farms and promotion stations under nearly 200 cooperation programs and carried out 23 fishery cooperation projects with 13 African countries." Exchange of technical staff is also an important part of the cooperation (more than 10 000 Chinese specialists sent to Africa).
Academic findings from 2009, claim that 14 such agro-technical demonstration stations had been started by China.

The employment mix between Chinese and local African workers varies between projects, yet many projects have a significant positive employment effect in their regions.

Chinese agricultural investment has to be analysed in the global context. It has received (mostly unfairly) exceptional international media coverage.

Examples 
The list of projects is long, yet here are a few illustrative examples
Wanbao Rice Farm, Mozambique, rice 
China-Zambia Friendship Farm, 630 ha, renewable 99 years lease
Hanhe Farm, Uganda, mushrooms and others, 160 ha 
Hubei-Gaza Friendship Farm, Rwanda, rice,
Anié Sugar Complex, Togo, sugar cane, 1 300 ha 

A comprehensive list of investments can be found in the book 'Will Africa feed China?'

See also 
Large-scale Agricultural Investments
China-Africa relations
Development Cooperation

References 

Agriculture in Africa
Friendship Farms